Kokapet is an emerging commercial and residential hub in Ranga Reddy District in Telangana, India. This place falls under Kokapet SEZ (Neopolis) and is as one of the most expensive commercial and residential locations in Hyderabad. It falls under Gandipet Mandal. It is three kilometres away from Gandipet and close to Rajiv Gandhi International Airport; it is almost an extension of Financial District and in the vicinity of the IT hub. High rise towers will come up at Neopolis Kokapet. Hyderabad-based My Home Group is firming up plans for a 30-35 million sq feet project at a cost of around $2 billion at Kokapet to build one of the largest private IT parks in India. My Home Constructions Pvt Ltd is developing it as a premium business district on the lines of Gurugram’s Cyber Hub that was developed by DLF. The commercial project being developed on 80-acre plot, will comprise a combination of SEZ and non-SEZ development along with MICE (Meetings, Incentives, Conferences, Exhibitions) tourism, star hotel, retail and entertainment facilities. The layout development is proposed with seamless connectivity to the Outer Ring Road by construction of Trumpet Interchange at Kokapet layout and additional entry and exit to the ORR at Narsingi. OKOS Gokarting is also located in Kokapet.

South India’s tallest residential building (skyscraper) , SAS Crown, is under-construction in the Golden Mile Layout at Kokapet. The Outer Ring Road passes through the village. This is the first ultra-luxury apartment in Hyderabad where one floor is dedicated for a single apartment.  In October 2017, the Supreme Court of India dismissed  the claim of K.S.B. Ali and others, who claim to be the legal heirs of Nawab Nusarath Jung 1, in regard to prestigious Golden Mile Project at Kokapet. The Hyderabad Metropolitan Development Authority (then known as HUDA), had auctioned 70 acres of land in Kokapet village, Rajendranagar mandal, in July 2006. A total of 168 acres were put up for auction, which fetched ₹ 1,775 crore for the Authority, including a bid amount of Rs 14.5 crore per acre for a five-acre plot.

In 2017, the two member bench of Supreme Court of India comprising Justice AK Sikri and Justice Ashok Bhushan dismissed this plea while upholding the division bench order of the High Court that HMDA has ownership rights in of 638 acres of land in Kokapet. The high court had declared that the  lower court had no power to confer rights over jagir lands except to the extent of cash grants and  vindicated the stand of the state government in declaring the 1,635 acres at Kokapet (Asadnagar) as government land under the Sarf-e-Khas (Merger) Regulation.

See also
 Narsingi, Ranga Reddy district
 Gandipet

References

Villages in Ranga Reddy district